A composer laureate is a position awarded by a government as an honor to a musical composer.

United Kingdom

United States

Arkansas
The first composer laureate of Arkansas (and the first composer laureate to be designated in the United States) was W. Francis McBeth, who served as Composer laureate from 1975 until his death in 2012. No new composer laureate has been selected since.

North Carolina
Hunter Johnson was selected as North Carolina's first composer laureate in 1991, a position which he held until his death in 1998.

See also
 poet laureate

Composers laureate